Astrid Carolina Herrera Irazábal (born June 23, 1963) is a Venezuelan actress and beauty queen. She won the 1984 Miss World pageant, held in London, United Kingdom, becoming the third woman from her country to win the title.

Biography 
Astrid Carolina Herrera Irazábal was born on June 23, 1963, in Yaracuy, Venezuela. She is the third daughter of David Herrera and Odelia Irazábal. She has three sisters and one brother.

Personal life 
In 1988, she married the military man Edgar Ignacio Padrón Godoy. The couple divorced in 2001. In 2002, she married the Venezuelan baseball player Tony Álvarez in the Mayor's Office of Carrizal, Miranda. The couple divorced in 2005. On June 5, 2014, she gave birth to her first child, a girl, whom she called Miranda Carolina Herrera Irazábal. In 2017, she underwent surgery for a tumor in the pituitary gland that turned out to be benign.

Pageantry

Miss World Venezuela

Miss World
As the official representative of her country to the 1984 Miss World pageant held in London, United Kingdom on November 15, 1984, she obtained the Photogenic award, became Miss World Americas and was crowned Miss World 1984.

Filmography

Television

References

External links
 

1963 births
Living people
Actresses from Caracas
Miss Venezuela World winners
Miss World 1984 delegates
Miss World winners
Venezuelan telenovela actresses
Venezuelan beauty pageant winners